Kullö is an island and a locality in the Stockholm archipelago in Sweden. It is situated in Vaxholm Municipality and Stockholm County, and had 889 inhabitants in 2010.

References 

Islands of the Stockholm archipelago
Islands of Vaxholm Municipality
Populated places in Vaxholm Municipality